Qazi Abdul Majeed Abid or Qazi Abid, was the father of Former National Speaker Fahmida Mirza and former member of the National Assembly and Chairman of the Daily Ibrat Newspaper Kazi Asad Abid. He died due to lung cancer on 27 August 1996. He was a prominent politician and journalist from Hyderabad, Sindh, Pakistan.  Qazi Abid held several positions in the Federal Cabinet of numerous Pakistani Prime Ministers.  His positions included Federal Minister for Information and Broadcasting, Federal Minister of Education, Federal Minister for Food and Agriculture, and Federal Minister for Water and Power. He was the publisher of the Daily Ibrat, a Sindhi newspaper, which is still published by his son Qazi Asad Abid. His excellence in the field of journalism was recognized formally when he was awarded the Writers' Forum Award in 1985.

Qazi Abdul Majeed Abid, along with his brother Qazi Muhammad Akbar (Qazi Akbar), are generally regarded as the patriarchs of the Qazis of Hyderabad. They also had a sister, Afroze Begum, who married Zafar Hussain Mirza, father of Zulfiqar Mirza. Qazi Akbar was a long serving provincial minister in Sindh, including being Home Minister.  Their father, Qazi Abdul Qayyum, was the first Muslim President of the Hyderabad Municipality.  Qazi Abid's progeny involved in Pakistani politics has included his daughter, Fahmida Mirza, who is the Speaker of the National Assembly in Pakistan; his son, Qazi Asad Abid, a former member of the National Assembly; his niece, Ameena Ashraf (Qazi Akbar's daughter), a former member of the National Assembly; and his great nephew, Pir Mazhar Ul Haq (Qazi Akbar's grandson), a three time Sindh Provincial Minister, who currently is the Senior Minister in the Provincial Cabinet, holding the portfolio of Education.

See also 
 Fahmida Mirza
 Pir Mazhar Ul Haq
 Qazi Asad Abid
 Qazis of Hyderabad

References

1915 births
1996 deaths
Sindhi people
20th-century Pakistani people